Prometea (born May 28, 2003), a Haflinger foal, is the first cloned horse and the first to be born from and carried by its cloning mother.  Her birth was announced publicly on August 6, 2003. Born 36 kilogram after a natural delivery and a full-term pregnancy in Laboratory of Reproductive Technology, Cremona, Italy, At 2 months old, Prometea weighed 

The ethics of cloning on horses still needs to be fully explored but there are concerns of genetic variability.  Cloning also allows for conservation of strong genetics and could be used for conserving specific equine lines that may need additional animals in the population. Some registries will not allow cloned horses to be entered.

The name "Prometea" is the feminine form of Prometeo ("Prometheus" in Greek).

Science
The horse is the seventh species to be cloned yet.
Dr. Cesare Galli and others at the lab experimented with 841 reconstructed embryos; of the 14 viable embryos, four were implanted in surrogate mothers - only that of Prometea succeeded in being born. Prometea was born to her twin mother who her cloning cells originated from. Texas A&M University was also undertaking a horse-cloning project when the Italian team first succeeded.
Horse cloning like Prometea could eliminate the problem of champion racing geldings. The Jockey Club of North America Thoroughbred Horses has proclaimed, however, that it will allow no cloned horse in their races.

Although horses are not threatened with extinction or other major problem now, cloning may create less genetic diversity among horses by using these horses to breed.  This increases the life time of one breeding set of genetics resulting in less variability in a population. In conservation biology, there are concerns related to the lack of genetic diversity that allows for continuation of the species through genetic variation.

See also
 List of historical horses

References

 World's first cloned horse is born New Scientist. Referenced March 6, 2011.
 Cloning Horseplay Science Now. Referenced March 6, 2011.
 photo

2003 animal births
Cloned horses